There have been more than 300 limited-edition seasonal and regional flavors of Kit Kat chocolate bars produced in Japan since 2000, many exclusive to the country and not produced elsewhere. Nestlé, which operates the Kit Kat brand in Japan, reports that the brand overtook Meiji Chocolate as the top-selling confectionery in Japan from 2012 to 2014. The company's marketing campaign, which partnered with Japan Post to sell the bar in 20,000 post offices, won an award in 2010. The campaign encouraged associations of the product's name with the coincidental cognate , translated as "You will surely win", and could be mailed as a good luck charm for students ahead of university exams.

History 

Kit Kats were introduced to Japan in 1973 when British confectioner Rowntree's made an agreement with Japanese confectioner and restaurant owner . In 2014, they were the top-selling confection in the country. The Kit Kat brand took the number one sales position from Meiji chocolate in 2012, though Meiji remains the leading confection company in Japan overall.

In 2004, the green tea flavor was introduced. Since then, the product has been sold in more than 300 seasonal and regional flavors. The top-selling flavor of the candy bar in 2010 was soy sauce. The company believes the limited-edition seasonal models create a "scarcity and rarity of value" for customers.

The business model was created to solve a problem the company found in Japanese convenience stores, which frequently rotated items and flavors off of shelves. By producing smaller runs of flavors, the company was better able to control its production costs. It was also economically viable in Japan because there is no initial product fee for listing new products in Japanese convenience stores.

The milk chocolate used for Kit Kats is made from whole-milk powder and Nestlé buys most of its cacao beans from West Africa.

Marketing 

Some market research has shown that the brand is strongly correlated to good luck charms, particularly among students ahead of exams. Kit Kat's "Lucky Charm" advertising campaign in Japan won the Asian Brand Marketing Effectiveness Award in 2005.

Nestlé and the Japan Post launched a campaign in 2009, allowing people to write messages and mail the chocolate bars from 20,000 post offices. The special packages included a space to write a message of encouragement and affix a stamp. The promotional packages were sold out within a month. The campaign won the Media Grand Prix in 2010's Cannes Lions International Advertising Festival.

Varieties 

The Kit Kat Chocolatory, with recipes designed by chef , opened in 2014, and had expanded to seven branches by 2015. The company claims it has served more than 1 million customers and earned more than 2 billion yen. These shops sell high-end Kit Kat products such as raspberry-infused dark chocolate, orange-chocolate rum, cherry blossom and green tea. A variety of 's flavors have been introduced as seasonal products, including flavors such as plum, passion fruit, chilli, ginger and kinako soybean powder. In 2016, Nestlé introduced a  Kit Kat, which combines  powder with white chocolate.

Some varieties are restricted to a specific region associated with that particular bar. Others are limited-run varieties, with excess supply saved for year-end "happy bag" specials. In 2015, 500 single-finger bitter chocolate bars were sold with gold leaf wrapping for about $16 in high-end retail shops.

Notable varieties include  (red bean),  (purple sweet potato), brown sugar syrup,  (green tea), and soy sauce.

The cafe shop Pronto has introduced croissants incorporating Kit Kats. Pizza chains Napoli  and Strawberry Cones introduced dessert pizzas with bakeable Kit Kat toppings in March 2014.

In October 2018, Nestle opened a Kit Kat store at Namba Station in Osaka.

Additional varieties

See also 
 Omiyage
 Meibutsu

References

External links
 
 

Japanese brand foods
Food and drink in Japan
Japanese desserts and sweets
Japanese confectionery
Chocolate bars
Nestlé brands